"Satisfaction" (stylized as "SATISFACTION") is a song by South Korean rock band F.T. Island. It is their fourth single under Warner Music Japan and seventh single overall in Japan, and is included on their second Japanese studio album Five Treasure Island. The song was written by Junji Ishiwatari and composed by Hiroki Horiko. It was released on April 20, 2011, in three editions: a CD-only edition, and limited editions A and B. The single debuted at number two on the Oricon weekly chart and went on to sell over 43,000 copies in Japan.

Composition
"Satisfaction" was written by Junji Ishiwatari, composed by Hiroki Horiko, and arranged by Satoru Hiraide. "Friends" was written by Lee Jae-jin and Hisashi Kondo, composed by Choi Jong-hoon and Shotaro Kobayashi, and arranged by F.T. Island and Kobayashi. "I Want" was written by Lee and Kondo, composed by Choi and Kobayashi, and arranged by F.T. Island and Yu Odakura.

"Satisfaction" was recorded in Korean and is included as a bonus track on the CD and DVD edition of F.T. Islands third Japanese studio album 20 [Twenty].

Release and promotion
"Satisfaction" was released on April 20, 2011, in three editions: a CD-only edition which includes one of seven random trading cards; a limited edition A which includes the music video of the song and a special feature; and a limited edition B which includes the completed version of Music On! TV's program Zensoku Zenshin! F.T. Island's "Zensoku Zenshin! F.T. Island Special" and outtakes.

"Satisfaction" was used as the ending theme music for Fuji Television's anime Toriko. F.T. Island performed the song on the network's music show Hey! Hey! Hey! Music Champ on May 2, 2011.

Chart performance
"Satisfaction" debuted at number two on the Oricon weekly singles chart, becoming F.T. Island's highest charting single to date, selling 34,163 copies in its first week. It charted for 13 weeks and went on to sell over 43,000 copies in Japan. On the issue dated May 2, 2011, the song debuted at number 9 on the Billboard Japan Hot 100. On the Recording Industry Association of Japan (RIAJ) Digital Track Chart, the song debuted at number 43, peaking at number 42 the following week.

Track listing

Chart history

Notes
  The sales figure of 43,000 copies is taken from accumulating the sales of the single during its first four charting weeks on the Oricon weekly chart (34,163, 4,196, 3,197, 1,502).

References

2011 singles
F.T. Island songs
Japanese-language songs
Songs written by Junji Ishiwatari
Warner Music Japan singles